The Battle of Bayou Fourche, also known as the Battle of Little Rock and the Engagement at Bayou Fourche, took place on September 10, 1863, in Pulaski County, Arkansas, and was the final battle of the Little Rock Campaign, also known as the Advance upon Little Rock, which began on August 1 to capture the capital. Union Major-General Frederick Steele's "Arkansas expedition," 15,000 strong, defeated Confederate Major-General Sterling Price's 7,749 District of Arkansas. The Confederate forces took up defensive positions in and around the city of Little Rock. The area of the battle was bisected by the Arkansas River, with the Bayou Fourche forming an additional obstacle to the south-east of Little Rock. Steele divided his army into two main sections in order to attack from both the east and south-east. There was fierce fighting at river crossing points and, following the crossing of the Bayou Fourche to the east of the city, the "Arkansas expedition" entered Little Rock and organized Confederate resistance collapsed. Price's army was able to escape capture.

Background 

On July 4, 1863, Vicksburg, Mississippi – the Gibraltar of the Confederacy – fell. With the Mississippi River again, in President Abraham Lincoln's words, running "unvexed to the sea," Steele, commanding the "Arkansas Expedition," proceeded from Helena on August 10 to lead the invasion of 12,000 troops west into Arkansas. Awakening to the distant rumble of artillery September 10, the citizens of Little Rock found themselves in the vortex of the conflict.

Battle 

On September 10, 1863, Steele sent a cavalry division led by Brigadier-General John W. Davidson across the Arkansas River to advance on Little Rock while he moved against Confederate forces strongly entrenched on the north side of the river. In his thrust toward the state capitol, Gen. Davidson ran into Marmaduke and Walker's divisions commanded by Brigadier-General John S. Marmaduke near the Bayou Fourche. Aided by field artillery from the north side of the river, Davidson forced Marmaduke out of his position and sent the defenders fleeing back to Little Rock, which fell to U.S. forces that evening.

Aftermath 
C.S. Army Major-General Sterling Price, commanding at Little Rock, fell back to Arkadelphia on the 14th, and eventually reestablished his command at Camp Bragg, Arkansas. Governor Harris Flanagin relocated the state capitol to Washington, Arkansas, where it remained for the rest of the war. The fall of Little Rock to Union forces after Vicksburg, sealed Arkansas' fate and helped to further demoralize Confederate citizens west of the Mississippi River.

Battlefield preservation 
The growth of Little Rock has obscured many of the sites associated with the battle and subsequent evacuation of the city. Today, several markers and monuments are located inside the Bayou Fourche Battlefield, but further expansion of Little Rock National Airport threatens to consume additional land.

See also  
 List of American Civil War battles
 Troop engagements of the American Civil War, 1863

References

Further reading 

 Burford, Timothy Wayne, and Stephanie Gail McBride. The Division: Defending Little Rock, August 25–September 10, 1863. Jacksonville, AR: WireStorm Publishing, 1999.
 Christ, Mark K. Civil War Arkansas, 1863: The Battle for a State. Norman: University of Oklahoma Press, 2010.
 
 “Here in the Wilds of Arkansas: Interpreting the 1863 Little Rock Campaign.” MLS thesis, University of Oklahoma, 2000.
 Huff, Leo E. “The Last Duel in Arkansas: The Marmaduke-Walker Duel.” Arkansas Historical Quarterly 23 (Spring 1964): 36–49.
 “‘The Sting of Being an Exile’: The Little Rock Campaign of 1863. Pulaski County Historical Review 61 (Spring 2013): 34–47.
 “The Union Expedition Against Little Rock.” Arkansas Historical Quarterly 22 (Fall 1963): 224–237

External links 

 
 Battle of Bayou Fourche at the Historical Marker Database

 
1863 in the American Civil War
1863 in Arkansas
Advance on Little Rock (American Civil War)
Battles of the American Civil War in Arkansas
Battles of the Trans-Mississippi Theater of the American Civil War
History of Pulaski County, Arkansas
Bayou Fourche
September 1863 events
Union victories of the American Civil War